Morebath Junction Halt  was a railway halt near the junction of the Devon and Somerset Railway and Exe Valley Railway in Devon, South West England.

Junction
The railway  junction at Morebath was opened in 1884 to connect the newly built Tiverton and North Devon Railway with the Devon and Somerset Railway that had been completed in 1873. The T&NDR became part of the Exe Valley Railway in 1885.

Morebath Junction is the only location in Britain to have had a signalwoman in the 19th century. Mrs Town was appointed in 1890, and in October 1913 The Railway Magazine reported that she was "very proud" of her job after 23 years' service and hoped to continue indefinitely.

Halt

The GWR opened a halt near Morebath Junction in 1928. Morebath Junction Halt was much nearer Morebath village, but was accessible only by a footpath across fields. It's recorded that passengers walking to the halt stored their boots under the bench in the waiting hut, and retrieved them on their return for the walk home across the wet fields.

The halt was a single platform and was designated as a halt throughout its working life. British Railways withdrew services from the Exe Valley line in 1963 and from the Devon and Somerset line in 1966.

Services

References

Disused railway stations in Devon
Former Great Western Railway stations
Railway stations in Great Britain opened in 1928
Railway stations in Great Britain closed in 1966
Beeching closures in England